Shepherd's Plain, also known as Melrose, is a historic home located near Pungoteague, Accomack County, Virginia. It was built between 1755 and 1775, and is a two-story, five bay rectangular Georgian-style dwelling with brick ends with interior end chimneys and frame fronts.  It measures 39 feet by 54 feet, and has a gable roof. The interior has a central passage plan and features notable paneling in the formal parlor. It was built for Edward Ker, a prominent Accomack County planter and politician.

It was added to the National Register of Historic Places in 1982.

References

External links

Shepherd's Plain, State Route 178, Pungoteague, Accomack County, VA: 8 photos and 3 data pages at Historic American Buildings Survey

Historic American Buildings Survey in Virginia
Houses on the National Register of Historic Places in Virginia
Georgian architecture in Virginia
Houses completed in 1765
National Register of Historic Places in Accomack County, Virginia
Houses in Accomack County, Virginia
1765 establishments in Virginia